The Tufts Beelzebubs, frequently referred to as "The Bubs", is a male a cappella group of students from Tufts University that performs a mix of pop, rock, R&B, and other types of music while spreading their motto of "Fun through Song." Founded in 1962, they have toured in Europe, Asia, South America, and North America, and they competed on NBC's The Sing-Off in December 2009, finishing in second place.

The group is best known for providing song arrangements and background vocals for the fictional all-male a cappella glee club "The Dalton Academy Warblers" on the American TV series Glee, although the Bubs do not play club members on screen. Singles by the Warblers, with series stars Darren Criss and Chris Colfer performing lead vocals, have collectively sold over 2 million copies. Due to their popularity, a full soundtrack album of the Warblers songs was released April 19, 2011 as Glee: The Music Presents the Warblers.

The Beelzebubs were the inspiration for the Barden University Treblemakers in the movie franchise Pitch Perfect, being one of the groups covered by Mickey Rapkin in Pitch Perfect: The Quest for Collegiate a Cappella Glory, the book the movies are loosely based on.

History

The Beelzebubs were originally named "Jumbo's Disciples" after the Tufts University mascot, but quickly shed this name and adopted the name "Beelzebubs", a reference from the epic poem Paradise Lost by John Milton. They were first seen at the Tufts annual Winter Sing in December 1962, and by May 1964 they had already performed with the Boston Pops and recorded their first album.

During the 1970s, they began adding popular music to the barbershop, doo-wop, gospel, and jazz standards so commonly associated with a cappella. The group flourishes due to a successful and active alumni association.

The 1991 album Foster St. abandoned a more traditional methodology and introduced a new style of arranging – especially with the addition of vocal percussion In 2006, the Bubs' CD Shedding swept the CARA awards for collegiate male a cappella winning best collegiate album, best solo, best arrangement, and best song.

The Bubs' performance schedule has grown to over 80 gigs per year. The Bubs have toured in Europe (England, France, the Netherlands, Greece, and Turkey), Asia (Hong Kong, Taiwan, Japan, Thailand, and Singapore), South America (Argentina and Brazil), and North America (Mexico, Canada, and the United States including Hawaii and Alaska). They have performed for many high-profile personalities such as Presidents Clinton and Obama, Sen. Hillary Clinton, Jay Leno, and Gov. Bill Richardson.  In 1999, the group made an appearance on the Late Show with David Letterman and performed at Fenway Park for the crowd at the Major League Baseball All-Star Game.

The Sing-Off
The Beelzebubs were one of eight vocal groups featured on the NBC television program The Sing-Off, which aired in December 2009.  The Bubs were selected amongst hundreds of groups to compete.  Having survived cuts by the judges in each of the first three shows, the Beelzebubs appeared in the finals on December 21, 2009, finishing second to Nota from Puerto Rico.  The competition's prize was $100,000 and a recording contract with Epic Records/Sony Music, and was determined by viewer voting.

According to The New York Times

 The Beelzebubs ... used the superstar-medley round to spring a surprise. Their choice of superstars was The Who, but they did not begin their number with any of the obvious rockers from that group's repertory; instead they served up a slow, haunting "Behind Blue Eyes."

Performances and results

The Bubs Foundation
The Beelzebubs are also proud of their continuing commitment to give back to the community through the Bubs Foundation. The Bubs Foundation, Inc. is a 501(c)(3), not-for-profit organization founded in 1991 by Beelzebubs alumni to "awaken in young people a passion for expression and learning through music". The organization consists of alumni and friends of the Beelzebubs dedicated to the Bubs Foundation mission to raise money for the music programs of Boston-area public schools.  So far the Foundation has donated over $50,000 in grants to 60 area music programs.

Glee 
The Bubs provided arrangement and background vocals for ten a cappella covers in the second season of the TV series Glee, all of which were released as singles, starting with Katy Perry's "Teenage Dream", with lead vocals by Darren Criss, which aired in the episode "Never Been Kissed" on November 9, 2010. The single had sales of 214,000 copies in its first week, the most of any Glee single in the show's history, and reached number eight on the Billboard Hot 100; it has since been certified a gold record in the US. Additional covers include Train's "Hey, Soul Sister", Destiny's Child's "Bills, Bills, Bills", Robin Thicke's "When I Get You Alone", "Animal", P!nk's "Raise Your Glass", and Maroon 5's "Misery". The ten covers, plus two others recorded with the Bubs that did not appear on the show, were included on an album, Glee: The Music Presents the Warblers, which was released on April 19, 2011, and debuted at number two on the US Billboard 200, selling 86,000 copies in its first week. A thirteenth song on the album by the Warblers did not involve the Bubs: "Blackbird" by The Beatles was covered by Chris Colfer with other background vocalists. The last cover to air during the season was Keane's "Somewhere Only We Know", which was broadcast during the episode "Born This Way", which first aired on April 26, 2011, and is included on the Warblers album.

Other Appearances
The Bubs were featured on the MTV show My Super Sweet 16.

One of the Bubs' previous releases (April 27, 2007) was their highly acclaimed and award-winning twenty-fifth studio album, titled Pandaemonium. Tracks from this album have been selected for Best of Collegiate A Cappella, Sing 4: Good Medicine, and Voices Only 2008. The album also received a perfect score from the Recorded A cappella Review Board. Like Shedding before it, Pandaemonium also swept the four all-male categories of the Contemporary A Cappella Recording Award, including Best Album, Best Song, Best Solo and Best Arrangement. The Beelzebubs have received perfect scores from the Recorded A cappella Review Board on every release since.

They perform at many schools across the world and have even coached students at the schools, teaching them various singing methods.

With over 300 members around the world, The Beelzebubs celebrated their 55-year anniversary in 2018.

Notable members
Peter Gallagher, actor.
Adam Gardner, musician in the alternative rock band Guster.
Jean Mayer, honorary member, hunger activist and former President of Tufts University.
Deke Sharon, founder of the Contemporary A Cappella Society and The House Jacks, arranger and vocal producer of Pitch Perfect

Awards

 

|-
| rowspan="4" | 2019
| rowspan="4" | Contemporary A Cappella Recording Awards
| Best Male Collegiate Album
| Full Rally
| style="background: #f4f49e; text-align: center;" | Runner-up
| 
|-
| Best Rock Song
| "Danger Zone" on Full Rally
| 
| rowspan="3" | 
|-
| Best Male Collegiate Arrangement
| Joel Reske, "Danger Zone"
| 
|-
| Best Male Collegiate Song
| "T-Shirt" on Full Rally
| 
|-
| rowspan="3" | 2018
| rowspan="3" | Contemporary A Cappella Recording Awards
| Best Male Collegiate Song
| "Who Do You Love" on Reboot - EP
| 
| 
|-
| Best Male Collegiate Arrangement
| "24k Magic" on Reboot - EP
| 
| rowspan="2" | 
|-
| Best Pop Song
| "24k Magic" on Reboot - EP
| 
|-
| 2016
| rowspan="1" | Contemporary A Cappella Recording Awards
| Best Male Collegiate Album
| In the Book
| 
| 
|-
| rowspan="5" | 2014
| rowspan="5" | Contemporary A Cappella Recording Awards
| Best All-Male Collegiate Album
| Helix
| 
| 
|-
| Best Soul/R&B/Hip-Hop Song
| "Alright" on Helix
| 
| rowspan="4" | 
|-
| Best Male Collegiate Song
| "Alright" on Helix
| 
|-
| Best Male Collegiate Solo
| Adam Gotbaum, "Madness"
| 
|-
| Best Male Collegiate Arrangement
| Michael Grant, "Alright"
| 
|-
| rowspan="3" | 2012
| rowspan="3" | Contemporary A Cappella Recording Awards
| Best All-Male Collegiate Album
| "Battle"
| 
| rowspan="3" | 
|-
| Best All-Male Collegiate song
| "Kings and Queens"
| 
|-
| Best All-Male Collegiate arrangement
| Alexander Koutzoukis, "Kings and Queens"
| style="background: #f4f49e; text-align: center;" | Runner-up (tie)
|-
| rowspan="7" | 2010
| rowspan="3" | Contemporary A Cappella Recording Awards
| Best All-Male Collegiate Album
| "Play the Game"
| 
| rowspan="3" | 
|-
| Best All-Male Collegiate arrangement
| Alexander Koutzoukis, "All the Love in the World"
| 
|-
| Best All-Male Collegiate song
| "Who Are You"
| 
|-
| rowspan="4" | A Cappella Community Awards
| Favorite Male Collegiate Group
| Themselves
| 
| rowspan="4" | 
|-
| Favorite Collegiate Album
| "Play the Game"
| 
|-
| Favorite Vocal Percussionist
| Alexander Koutzoukis
| style="background: #f4f49e; text-align: center;" | Runner-up
|-
| Favorite Medley
| "The Who Medley"
| style="background: #f4f49e; text-align: center;" | Runner-up
|-
| rowspan="4" | 2008
| rowspan="4" | Contemporary A Cappella Recording Awards
| Best All-Male Collegiate Album
| "Pandaemonium"
| 
| rowspan="4" | 
|-
| Best All-Male Collegiate arrangement
| Ed Boyer, "Digging in the Dirt"
| 
|-
| Best All-Male Collegiate song
| "Magical Mystery Tour"
|  (tie)
|-
| Best All-Male Collegiate Soloist
| Andrew Savini, "When I Get You Alone"
| 
|-
| rowspan="5" | 2006
| rowspan="4" | Contemporary A Cappella Recording Awards
| Best All-Male Collegiate Album
| "Shedding"
| 
| rowspan="4" | 
|-
| Best All-Male Collegiate arrangement
| Travis Marshall, "Everybody Wants to Rule the World"
| 
|-
| Best All-Male Collegiate song
| "Let's Get It Started"
| 
|-
| Best All-Male Collegiate Soloist
| Andrew Savini, "Epiphany"
| 
|-
| A Cappella Community Awards
| Favorite Male Group in the Nation
| Themselves
| 
| 
|-
| 2005
| A Cappella Community Awards
| Favorite Male Group in the Nation
| Themselves
| 
| 
|-
| rowspan="3" | 2004
| rowspan="3" | Contemporary A Cappella Recording Awards
| Best All-Male Collegiate Album
| "Code Red"
| style="background: #f4f49e; text-align: center;" | Runner-up
| rowspan="2" | 
|-
| Best All-Male Collegiate arrangement
| Ed Boyer, "Hot in Here"
| style="background: #f4f49e; text-align: center;" | Runner-up
|-
| Best All-Male Collegiate song
| "Take Me Home"
| 
| 
|-
| rowspan="3" | 2002
| rowspan="3" | Contemporary A Cappella Recording Awards
| Best All-Male Collegiate Album
| "Next"
| style="background: #f4f49e; text-align: center;" | Runner-up
| 
|-
| Best All-Male Collegiate arrangement
| Ed Boyer, "Bills, Bills, Bills"
| 
| 
|-
| Best All-Male Collegiate Soloist
| Isaac Brody, “Disco Inferno”
| 
| 
|-
| rowspan="2" | 2000
| rowspan="2" | Contemporary A Cappella Recording Awards
| Best All-Male Collegiate Album
| "Infinity"
| 
| rowspan="2" | 
|-
| Best All-Male Collegiate song
| "That’s the Way"
| 
|-
| rowspan="2" | 1998
| rowspan="2" | Contemporary A Cappella Recording Awards
| Best All-Male Collegiate arrangement
| Danny Lichtenfield, "I am the Walrus"
| 
| 
|-
| Best All-Male Collegiate song
| "Sledgehammer" from Id
| 
| 
|-
| rowspan="2" | 1997
| rowspan="2" | Contemporary A Cappella Recording Awards
| Best All-Male Collegiate arrangement
| Todd Herzog, "Shape of my Heart" from Drift
| style="background: #f4f49e; text-align: center;" | Runner-up
| rowspan="2" | 
|-
| Best All-Male Collegiate song
| "With or Without You"
| style="background: #f4f49e; text-align: center;" | Runner-up
|-
| rowspan="2" | 1996
| rowspan="2" | Contemporary A Cappella Recording Awards
| Best All-Male Collegiate Album
| “Gilding”
| 
| rowspan="2" | 
|-
| Best All-Male Collegiate arrangement
| Danny Lichtenfield "Blood of Eden"
| 
|-
| rowspan="3" | 1995
| rowspan="3" | Contemporary A Cappella Recording Awards
| Best All-Male Collegiate arrangement
| Todd Herzog, "Hey You"
| 
| rowspan="3" | 
|-
| Best All-Male Collegiate song
| "Hey You"
| style="background: #f4f49e; text-align: center;" | Runner-up
|-
| Best All-Male Collegiate Soloist
| Matt Trowbridge, “The Water is Wide"
| style="background: #f4f49e; text-align: center;" | Runner-up
|-
| rowspan="4" | 1994
| rowspan="4" | Contemporary A Cappella Recording Awards
| Best All-Male Collegiate Album
| "Vince"
| 
| rowspan="4" | 
|-
| Best All-Male Collegiate arrangement
| Gardner & Herzog, "Sympathy for the Devil"
| style="background: #f4f49e; text-align: center;" | Runner-up
|-
| Best All-Male Collegiate song
| "Mercy Street"
| 
|-
| Best All-Male Collegiate Soloist
| Todd Herzog
| 
|-
| rowspan="4" | 1992
| rowspan="4" | Contemporary A Cappella Recording Awards
| Best All-Male Collegiate Album
| "Foster Street"
| 
| rowspan="4" | 
|-
| Best All-Male Collegiate arrangement
| Deke Sharon, "Comfortably Numb/Brain Damage"
| 
|-
| Best All-Male Collegiate song
| "Rio"
| 
|-
| Best All-Male Collegiate Soloist
| Todd Herzog
|

Discography

References

External links
Beelzebubs official website
The Bubs Foundation website
BOCA

Tufts University
Collegiate a cappella groups
Musical groups established in 1962
1962 establishments in Massachusetts
Men's organizations in the United States